The Zanaihorn (2,821 m) is a mountain of the Glarus Alps, located north of Vättis in the canton of St. Gallen. It lies on the range east of the Pizol, between the valleys of the Zanaibach and the Tersolbach.

References

External links
Zanaihorn on Hikr

Mountains of the Alps
Mountains of Switzerland
Mountains of the canton of St. Gallen